Habibolah Bitaraf is an Iranian reformist politician. He was Energy Minister for 8 years during Mohammad Khatami presidency. He also served as provincial governor of Yazd.

He was nominated as the energy minister by President Hassan Rouhani on 8 August 2017 but he was the only nominee who did not gain a vote of confidence from the parliament on 20 August 2017, with 133 yeas, 132 nays, 17 abstentions and 6 invalid votes.

Bitaraf is a founding member of the Islamic Iran Participation Front.

References

Living people
Government ministers of Iran
Muslim Student Followers of the Imam's Line
Islamic Iran Participation Front politicians
1956 births
Iranian campaign managers
People from Yazd
Iranian civil engineers
20th-century Iranian engineers
20th-century Iranian politicians
21st-century Iranian politicians
21st-century Iranian engineers
Governors of Yazd Province